SCC Berlin is a German sports club based in the Charlottenburg district of Berlin and founded in 1902 as Charlottenburger Sport-Club 1902. In 1911, they merged with Sport-Club Westen 05 and changed their club colors from yellow and blue to black and white.

History 
Through the early 1920s the club went through other mergers and played football in the Oberliga Berlin-Brandenburg (I) as Union-SCC Charlottenburg – through its association with FC Union Halensee (1898) – with their best result coming in 1922 when they finished as vice-champions after losing a two-game final to Norden-Nordwest Berlin (2–4, 0–1). The club changed its name to SC Charlottenburg in 1927 and was relegated that same year. SCC returned to the Oberliga for a single season in 1928–29.

Charlottenburg played lower-tier football throughout the 1930s and most of the 1940s. After World War II it was one of a number of sides that was part of a single association known as SG Charlottenburg representing the district. The combined side re-appeared in the top flight in the Oberliga Berlin in 1946, promptly capturing the division title.

SG Charlottenburg soon began to break up into its original separate clubs and in 1949 SC Charlottenburg re-emerged to play third tier football. They were promoted to the Amateurliga Berlin in 1950 for a three-season turn before being relegated. In 1963, the same year that the Bundesliga, Germany's new professional league, was formed, SCC made a single season appearance in the Amateurliga before slipping from sight into lower division play.

Charlottenburg enjoyed a brief resurgence in the early 1980s, rising quickly through the Landesliga Berlin (IV) and the Amateur Oberliga Berlin (III) to play the 1983–84 season in the 2. Bundesliga. That campaign ended in the failure of an 18th-place finish and relegation. The team remained competitive, earning a second-place result in the Oberliga in 1985 and another title in 1986. SCC took part in the subsequent promotion round for 2. Bundesliga play, but finished behind FC St. Pauli and Rot-Weiss Essen, before crashing disastrously to a last-place finish the following season. The club competed in the third and fourth division through the balance of the 1980s and well on into the 1990s before finally slipping to the fifth tier Berlin-Liga and Landesliga Berlin. A runners-up finish in the latter in 2015 took the club back up to the Berlin-Liga but it was relegated back to the Landesliga in 2016.

Other activities 
Today one of Berlin's largest sports clubs, SCC offers a wide variety of activities to its membership including American football (Berlin Rebels), baseball and softball, basketball, handball, ice hockey, field hockey, athletics, tennis, swimming, and volleyball.

Volleyball Bundesliga 

Berlin Recycling Volleys was during several years the biggest rival of VfB Friedrichshafen. They won three German Championships; in 1993, 2003 and 2004, as well as three German Cups in 1994, 1996, and 2000. In the season 2004–05 lost of the SCC, nevertheless, in the semi-final unexpectedly against the new vice master evivo Düren and became, finally, only fourth. A year later the Berliners could protect the third place to themselves after a renewed half final defeat against evivo Düren. In 2007 they fail for the third time in the semi-final in evivo Düren, but in 2008 they became for the third time according to 2000 and 2002 vice masters. The cadre for the season 2008–09 exists of twelve players. Besides, there were in each case six departures and new players.

The home matches take place in Sömmering-Hall with a capacity of 2,600.

SCC Berlin changed their name to the "Berlin Recycling Volleys" in 2011.

Stadium 
The football side plays its home matches at the Mommsenstadion (capacity: 15,005) which was built in 1930 and known originally as SCC-Stadion.

Honours 
The club's honours:
 Landesliga Berlin
 Champions (IV): 1982
 Oberliga Berlin (II/III)
 Champions: 1947, 1983, 1986
 Oberliga Berlin-Brandenburg
 Runners-up: 1921
 Berliner Landespokal (III-VII)
 Winners: 1983, 1986
 Runners-up: 1985

See also
Berlin derby

External links 
  
 SCC football 
 The Abseits Guide to German Soccer

Football clubs in Germany
Charlottenburg
Association football clubs established in 1902
1902 establishments in Germany
Charlottenburg
Charlottenburg
Charlottenburg
2. Bundesliga clubs